The following is a complete list of Grands Prix which have been a part of the Grand Prix motorcycle racing championship season since its inception in .

As of the 2022 Qatar Grand Prix, 29 countries have hosted 53 different Grands Prix for a total of 975 events.

Both the Dutch TT and the Italian Grand Prix have run every year since 1949 with the exception of 2020, sharing the record total of 72 events held. Spain has hosted a record eleven different Grands Prix for the record total of 139 events held.

The number of Grands Prix per decade has continued to increase: Six events held in 1949 were followed by 75 in the 1950s, 113 in the 1960s, 124 in the 1970s, 131 in the 1980s, 144 in the 1990s, 167 in the 2000s, and 181 in the 2010s.  While each of the 1949, 1950, 1956, and 1957 seasons featured only six Grands Prix, 2019 saw a record 19 events.

Active and past races

By race title
Bold denotes the 20 Grand Prix races held in the 2022 season.

By host nation
Bold denotes the 20 Grand Prix races held in the 2022 season.

Races by season

1949–1959

1960–1969

1970–1979

1980–1989

1990–1999

2000–2009

2010–2019

2020–2022

Notes

 
Grand Prix races